An amebocyte or amoebocyte is a mobile cell (moving like an amoeba) in the body of invertebrates including cnidaria, echinoderms, molluscs, tunicates, sponges and some chelicerates. They move by pseudopodia. Similarly to some of the white blood cells of vertebrates, in many species amebocytes are found in the blood or body fluid and play a role in the defense of the organism against pathogens. Depending on the species, an amebocyte may also digest and distribute food, dispose of wastes, form skeletal fibers, fight infections, and change into other cell types. 

Limulus amebocyte lysate, an aqueous extract of amebocytes from the Atlantic horseshoe crab (Limulus polyphemus), is commonly used in a test to detect bacterial endotoxins.

In sponges, amebocytes, also known as archaeocytes, are cells found in the mesohyl that can transform into any of the animal's more specialized cell types.

In tunicates they are blood cells and use pseudopodia to attack pathogens that enter the blood, transport nutrients, get rid of waste products, and grow/repair the tunica.
In older literature, the term amebocyte is sometimes used as a synonym of phagocyte.

References

External links

Motile cells